Christy Tony Maalouf (born 20 December 2005) is a Lebanese footballer who plays as an attacking midfielder or winger for Lebanese club EFP and the Lebanon national team.

Club career 
Maalouf began her career at the Jeita Country Club, before moving to Zouk Mosbeh. She then joined EFP.

International career

Youth 
Maalouf played for Lebanon U15 at the 2019 WAFF U-15 Championship, winning the tournament as the top scorer with nine goals in two games. She also won the 2022 WAFF U-18 Girls Championship with Lebanon U18 as the tournament's best player.

Senior 
On 24 August 2021, Maalouf made her senior international debut for Lebanon on 24 August 2021, as a starter in a 0–0 draw against Tunisia in the 2021 Arab Women's Cup. She scored her first goal on 30 August, in a 5–1 win against Sudan. Maalouf scored three goals in two friendly games against Syria, on 12 and 14 August 2022, including a brace in the second game.

Maalouf took part in the 2022 WAFF Women's Championship; she helped her side finish runners-up, scoring twice against Palestine and Syria.

Career statistics

International
Scores and results list Lebanon's goal tally first, score column indicates score after each Maalouf goal.

Honours 
EFP
 Lebanese Women's FA Cup: 2020–21
 Lebanese Women's Super Cup runner-up: 2021–22

Lebanon U15
 WAFF U-15 Girls Championship: 2019; runner-up: 2018

Lebanon U18
 WAFF U-18 Girls Championship: 2022

Lebanon
 WAFF Women's Championship runner-up: 2022

Individual
 WAFF U-15 Girls Championship top goalscorer: 2019

See also
 List of Lebanon women's international footballers

References

External links

 
 

2005 births
Living people
People from Jounieh
Lebanese women's footballers
Women's association football midfielders
Women's association football wingers
Zouk Mosbeh SC footballers
Eleven Football Pro players
Lebanese Women's Football League players
Lebanon women's youth international footballers
Lebanon women's international footballers